James Oneil "L. J." McCray II (born June 18, 1991) is an American football safety. He played college football at Catawba College and attended Harding University High School in Charlotte, North Carolina.

College career
McCray played for the Catawba Indians from 2009 to 2013. He was redshirted in 2011 after sustaining an injury. He was a first-team All-South Atlantic Conference selection in 2012. He recorded 78 tackles, 2 sacks and 8 pass break ups his senior year in 2013.

Professional career

San Francisco 49ers
McCray was signed by the San Francisco 49ers on May 10, 2014, after going undrafted in the 2014 NFL Draft. He made his NFL debut on September 7, 2014, against the Dallas Cowboys.

On September 3, 2016, McCray was traded to the Seattle Seahawks for an undisclosed draft pick, but failed his physical examination with them, voiding the trade. He was then waived by 49ers on September 5, 2016.

Carolina Panthers
On January 5, 2017, McCray signed a reserve/future contract with the Carolina Panthers. He was placed on injured reserve on September 2, 2017. On September 11, 2017, he was waived with an injury settlement.

Buffalo Bills
On October 17, 2017, McCray was signed to the Buffalo Bills' practice squad. He was released on January 2, 2018. He signed a reserve/future contract with the Bills on January 10, 2018.

On August 28, 2018, McCray was released by the Bills.

Saskatchewan Roughriders
McCray signed a one-year contract extension with the Saskatchewan Roughriders on January 18, 2021. He was placed on the suspended list on July 3, 2021.

References

Living people
1991 births
Players of American football from South Carolina
People from Georgetown, South Carolina
American football safeties
African-American players of American football
Catawba Indians football players
San Francisco 49ers players
Carolina Panthers players
Buffalo Bills players
Saskatchewan Roughriders players
Canadian football defensive backs
Players of Canadian football from South Carolina
21st-century African-American sportspeople